Superman (also known as Clark Kent and Kal-El) is a DC comic book superhero.

Superman may also refer to:

Arts and entertainment
 Superman (franchise), a media franchise based on the comic book character

Comic books and strips
 Superman (comic book)
 Superman vol. 2, the series that ran from 1987–2006
 Superman (Volume 3), the series that ran from 2011–2016
 Superman (comic strip), a comic strip that ran from 1939 to 1966
 Superman (Earth-One), the Silver Age incarnation of Superman
 Superman (Earth-Two), a character from Earth-Two based on Superman as he originally appeared
 Superman (Kal Kent), the Superman of the 853rd century
 Superman (Kingdom Come), an alternate version of Superman from the Elseworlds miniseries Kingdom Come
 Superman (Hernan Guerra), an alternate version of Chris Kent

Film, radio, and television

 Superman (1940s animated film series), a series of cartoons released in 1941 and 1942
 Superman (1941 film), a Fleischer Studios animated short film
 The Adventures of Superman (radio series), a radio show which ran from 1940–1951
 Superman (serial), a 1948 movie serial starring Kirk Alyn
 Adventures of Superman (TV series), a TV series starring George Reeves
 Superman (1978 film), a film starring Christopher Reeve
 Superman (1980 film), a Telugu-language Indian film
 Superman (1987 film), a Hindi-language Indian film
 Superman (1997 film), a Malayalam-language Indian film
 Superman (TV series), a 1988 animated series produced by Ruby-Spears
 Lois & Clark: The New Adventures of Superman, a television series from 1993-1997
 Superman: The Animated Series, a 1996 animated series starring Timothy Daly
 "Super Man", an episode of CSI: NY
 Superman Returns (2006 film)
 Man of Steel, 2013 film starring Henry Cavill as Superman.
 Batman v Superman: Dawn of Justice, 2016 film starring Henry Cavill as Superman and Ben Affleck as Batman
 Justice League 2017 film.
 Superman & Lois, a drama television series based on the characters Superman and Lois Lane

Video games
 Superman (arcade game) (1988)
 Superman (Atari 2600), a video game for the Atari 2600
 Superman (Kemco game), a video game for the NES
 Superman (Sunsoft game), a video game for the Mega Drive/Genesis
 Superman 64, a video game for the Nintendo 64

Other fictional characters
 Bill Dunn or the Superman, a character from The Reign of the Superman by Jerry Siegel

Music

Albums
 Superman (Arash album)
 Superman (Gary Chaw album)
 Superman (Alison MacCallum album)
 Superman (Barbra Streisand album)
 Superman, an album by Machi
 the soundtrack to the 1978 film Superman; see Superman music

Songs
 "Superman" (Lazlo Bane song), the original opening theme of Scrubs
 "Superman" (Black Lace song)
 "The Supermen", a song by David Bowie
 "Superman" (The Clique song), a song notably covered by R.E.M.
 "Superman" (Eminem song)
 "Superman" (Donna Fargo song)
 "Superman (It's Not Easy)", a song by Five for Fighting
 "Superman" (Crystal Kay song)
 "(Wish I Could Fly Like) Superman", a song by the Kinks on their 1979 album Low Budget
 "Superman" (Pepe Luis Soto song), a song by Celi Bee and the Buzzy Bunch
 "Superman" (Stereophonics song)
 "Superman" (Unwritten Law song)
 "Superman" (Keith Urban song), 2020
 "Superman", a song by Joe Brooks
 "Superman (Meets The Man Of Steel)", a song by Chalk Circle from The Great Lake
 "Superman", a song by Gabriella Cilmi from Ten
 "Superman", a song by the Game from L.A.X.
 "Superman", a song by Goldfinger from Hang-Ups
 "Superman", a song by Hadise from Aşk Kaç Beden Giyer?
 "Supermen", a song by Dino Merlin
 "Superman", a song by Offer Nissim featuring Maya Simantov
 "Superman", a song by Rachel Platten from Wildfire
 "Superman", a song by Skee-Lo from I Wish
 "Superman", a song by Super Junior
 "Superman", a song by Taylor Swift from Speak Now
 "Superman", a 2011 song by Mat Zo

Roller coasters
 Superman: Escape from Krypton, a roller coaster at Six Flags Magic Mountain
 Superman: Ride of Steel, a roller coaster at Six Flags America
 Superman: Ultimate Flight, a flying roller coaster at various Six Flags parks
 Superman: Ultimate Flight (Six Flags Discovery Kingdom)

Sport and racing

 Superman, a type of cycling stunt
 The superman as used by Mat Rempits
 The superman, a cycling position created by Graeme Obree

Other uses
 Superhuman
 Superman (gene), a plant gene in Arabidopsis thaliana
 Superman (Psychomech), a fictional race in the novel Psychomech
 Tathāgata or Superman, a Buddhist concept
 Übermensch or Superman, a concept of Nietzsche
 Superman, a monster truck

People with the nickname Superman
 Gianluigi Buffon (born 1978), Italian football player
 John Cena (born 1977), WWE professional wrestler
 Sam Fuld (born 1981), American Major League Baseball player and General Manager
 Dennis Hallman (born 1975), American MMA fighter
 Dwight Howard (born 1985), American National Basketball Association player
 Miguel Ángel López (born 1994), Colombian cyclist
 Cam Newton (born 1989), American football player
 Shaquille O'Neal (born 1972), American retired National Basketball Association player
 Art Pennington (born 1923), American retired Negro league baseball player
 Kevin Pillar (born 1989), American Major League baseball player
 Sean Rosenthal (born 1980), American beach volleyball player

See also
 "O Superman", a song by Laurie Anderson
 Suparman (disambiguation)
 Superman X, a character in the Legion of Super-Heroes animated television series
 "Superman's Song", a song by the Crash Test Dummies
 New man (disambiguation)
 Superhero (disambiguation)
 Superhuman (disambiguation)
 Supergirl (disambiguation)
 South Road Superway